The 2019–20 Brown Bears men's basketball team represented Brown University in the 2019–20 NCAA Division I men's basketball season. The Bears, led by eighth-year head coach Mike Martin, played their home games at the Paul Bailey Pizzitola Memorial Sports Center in Providence, Rhode Island, as members of the Ivy League.

Previous season
The Bears finished the 2018–19 season 20–12 overall, 7–7 in Ivy League play, to finish in a three-way tie for fourth place. Due to tiebreakers, they failed to qualify for the Ivy League tournament. They were invited to the CBI, where they defeated UAB in the first round, before falling to Loyola Marymount in the quarterfinals.

Roster

Schedule and results

|-
!colspan=12 style=| Non-conference regular season

|-
!colspan=9 style=| Ivy League regular season

|-

Source

References

Brown Bears men's basketball seasons
Brown Bears
Brown Bears men's basketball
Brown Bears men's basketball